Pablo Aguilar (born 13 September 1984) is an Argentine football right back currently playing for San Martín San Juan.

Aguilar made his professional debut in 2003 playing for Chacarita Juniors in the Argentine Primera División. At the end of the 2003–2004 season Chacarita were relegated, but Argilar stayed with the club in the 2nd division until 2007 when he joined Newell's Old Boys. He became a Mexican naturalised citizen.

References

External links
 Argentine Primera statistics at Fútbol XXI  
 
 Statistics at BDFA 

1984 births
Living people
People from San Luis Province
Argentine footballers
Association football defenders
Argentine Primera División players
Primera Nacional players
Chacarita Juniors footballers
Newell's Old Boys footballers
Tiro Federal footballers
Defensa y Justicia footballers
Club Atlético Sarmiento footballers
San Martín de San Juan footballers
Naturalized citizens of Mexico